Grassy is an unincorporated community in Marshall County, in the U.S. state of Alabama.

History
A post office called Grassy was established in 1882, and remained in operation until 1905. Phil Williams, Alabama state representative, was born in Grassy.

References

Unincorporated communities in Marshall County, Alabama
Unincorporated communities in Alabama